Chelis strigulosa is a moth in the family Erebidae. It was described by Böttcher in 1905. It is found in Central Asia (Kirghiz Alatau, Sussamyr, Terskei Alatau, Inner Tien Shan, Trans-Ili Alatau, Dzhungarian Alatau, Tarbagatai, eastern Tien Shan).

References

Moths described in 1905
Arctiina